The Rochelle–Prince House is a historic home located at Courtland, Southampton County, Virginia.  The original section dates to about 1814.  The house consists of a 1 1/2-half-story, two-bay block attached to a two-story, three-bay block.  The house was enlarged and remodeled between 1826 and 1827 and a rear ell was added about 1900.

James Rochelle was clerk of the Southampton County court during the trial of Nat Turner. His nephew was George Henry Thomas, a Union general in the American Civil War.

It was listed on the National Register of Historic Places in 2011.

References

Houses on the National Register of Historic Places in Virginia
Houses completed in 1814
Houses in Southampton County, Virginia
National Register of Historic Places in Southampton County, Virginia
Museums in Southampton County, Virginia
Historic house museums in Virginia